Megachile toxopei is a species of bee in the family Megachilidae. It was described by Johann Dietrich Alfken in 1926.

References

Toxopei
Insects described in 1926